Drop Out with The Barracudas is the debut studio album by English rock band The Barracudas, released in 1981 by record label Zonophone. The US version released on Voxx Records with an alternative cover features a revised track listing, replacing "Campus Tramp" with "Surfers Are Back".

Track listing

Personnel 
 The Barracudas

 Jeremy Gluck – vocals
 Robin Wills – guitar, vocals
 David Buckley – synthesizer, bass guitar, vocals
 Nick Turner – drums, vocals

 Additional personnel

 John David – production, mixing
 Kenny Laguna – production, engineering
 Pat Moran – production, mixing

References

External links 

 

The Barracudas albums
1981 debut albums
Caroline Records albums
Albums produced by Pat Moran
Albums recorded at Rockfield Studios